The Brussels Universities cross is a cyclo-cross race held in Brussels, Belgium, which is part of the DVV Trophy.

Past winners

References

Cycle races in Belgium
Cyclo-cross races
Recurring sporting events established in 2019
2019 establishments in Belgium
Sport in Brussels